Frank Angelo Joseph "Creepy" Crespi (February 16, 1918 – March 1, 1990) was a Major League Baseball player who played infielder from - for the St. Louis Cardinals. He made his major league debut on 14 September 1938 playing second base for the Cardinals.

In 1951, longtime Cardinals star shortstop Marty Marion praised Crespi as the best defensive second baseman he'd ever played with. "For one year—1941—Crespi was the best second baseman I ever saw. He did everything, and sensationally." 

Frank Crespi's nickname, 'Creepy', is widely considered one of the more colorful and unusual names in baseball history. In a 1977 radio interview with future Hall of Fame broadcaster Jack Buck, Crespi told Buck people still called him by his nickname. Buck followed up with, "Why do they call you that?" Crespi replied, "Well, it's an involved thing...I used to hear a lot of different stories. But I think the best one is [from] some sportswriter. He said the way I creep up on a ball, because I run low to the ground after a ground ball."

Although Crespi lost the starting second base job for the Cardinals in 1942 to Jimmy Brown, he still appeared in 93 games that season. The Cardinals won the National League pennant and played the New York Yankees in the 1942 World Series. Crespi played in one game in the World Series, serving as a pinch runner in game 1, and scoring a run. The Cardinals won the series, four games to one.

World War II

Crespi was drafted into the army in early 1943. Though he qualified for a deferment as the sole supporter of his elderly mother, he refused, claiming, "I don't think I'm too good to fight for the things I've always enjoyed."

During an Army baseball game in Kansas, he suffered a compound fracture of his left leg while turning a double play. Soon afterwards, he broke the same leg during a training accident, and later he broke it a third time during an impromptu wheelchair race while in the hospital.

While he was recuperating at the hospital, a nurse accidentally applied 100 times the appropriate quantity of boric acid to his bandages, causing severe burns on Crespi's leg and leaving him with a permanent limp.

According to Marty Marion, a total of 23 operations were performed on Crespi's leg.

After the war

In an attempt to qualify for the major league pension plan, Crespi applied various times as coach. Unable to obtain the position, he became a budget analyst for McDonnell Douglas, where he worked for 20 years.

After his retirement from McDonnell Douglas, Crespi discovered that he had not been retired from baseball, but rather had been on the disabled list, when the major league had first implemented its pension plan during the 1940s. This discovery entitled Crespi to his major league pension.

Crespi died of a heart attack on 1 March 1990 in Florissant, Missouri.

References

External links

 Creepy Crespi at SABR (Baseball BioProject)

1918 births
1990 deaths
Major League Baseball infielders
Baseball players from Missouri
St. Louis Cardinals players
United States Army personnel of World War II
Burials at Calvary Cemetery (St. Louis)
Columbus Red Birds players
Rochester Red Wings players
Shelby Cardinals players
Springfield Cardinals players